Live at the Corner is a digitally released live album by Australian electronic rock band Tame Impala. It was recorded on 23 October 2009 at the Corner Hotel in Melbourne, Australia. This recording differs from regular live album releases as it came as a bonus for a limited time with the purchase of their debut album Innerspeaker, and could only be accessed by inserting the CD into a computer CD drive, and was not released in a physical format.   This recording is also unique from their discography as the live versions of these previously recorded songs feature extended improvised jams and differ in sound and structure from their recorded counterparts.

Track listing
All songs written by Kevin Parker.

Personnel
 Kevin Parker – vocals, guitar
 Jay Watson – drums, backing vocals
 Dominic Simper – guitar, keys
 Nick Allbrook – bass

References

2010 live albums
Tame Impala live albums
Modular Recordings live albums
Albums produced by Kevin Parker